Zwiener is a German surname. Notable people with the surname include:

Erin Zwiener (born 1985), American author and politician
Philip Zwiener (born 1985), German basketball player
Sabine Zwiener (born 1967), German middle-distance runner

See also
Zwirner

German-language surnames